The 1992 All-Ireland Senior Football Championship was the 106th staging of the All-Ireland Senior Football Championship, the Gaelic Athletic Association's premier inter-county Gaelic football tournament. The championship began on 17 May 1992 and ended on 20 September 1992.

Down entered the championship as the defending champions; however, they were defeated by Derry in the Ulster semi-final.

Clare shocked many people by defeating Kerry in the Munster final to win only their second provincial senior title (their first having come in 1917); they narrowly lost to Dublin in the All-Ireland semi-final.

Ulster champions Donegal then defeated Dublin in the All-Ireland final by 0-18 to 0-14, thus claiming their first All-Ireland senior title.

Results

Connacht Senior Football Championship

Quarter-finals

Semi-finals

Final

Leinster Senior Football Championship

Preliminary round

Quarter-finals

 

Semi-finals

Final

Munster Senior Football Championship

Quarter-finals

Semi-finals

Final

Ulster Senior Football Championship

Preliminary round

Quarter-finals

Semi-finals

Final

All-Ireland Senior Football Championship

Semi-finals

Final

Championship statistics

Scoring

Overall

Single game

Miscellaneous

 Kildare play Westmeath meet in the Leinster championship for the first time since 1975.
 Clare won the Munster final for the first time since 1917.
 Donegal win the All Ireland final for the first time. The first new county since Offaly in 1971 to win the title for first time. There were a number of first-time championship meetings. The complete All Ireland Series from the Semi-finals of Donegal vs Mayo, Dublin vs Clare and the final between Donegal and Dublin were all the first championship meetings of the teams.